2 Guns is a 2013 American buddy cop action comedy film directed by Baltasar Kormákur and starring Denzel Washington and Mark Wahlberg. It is based on the comic book series of the same name created by Steven Grant and Mateus Santolouco, published in 2007 by Boom! Studios. The film was released in the United States on August 2, 2013, and was met with mixed reviews from critics.

Plot
Robert "Bobby" Trench and Michael "Stig" Stigman are two criminals working together. Unbeknownst to each other, Bobby is an undercover DEA Special Agent  and Stig is an undercover US Navy SEAL and Petty Officer 1st Class with the United States Navy Office of NavaI Intelligence. They meet drug lord Manny "Papi" Greco at his farm in Mexico, where Papi gives Bobby a packet of cash instead of the cocaine he requested.

Upon their return to the U.S., Bobby reports to his superior, Special Agent Jessup, and fellow agent Deb Rees, that he did not get the cocaine they need to convict Papi. Aftewards, Bobby privately tells Rees, his lover, that he will help Stig rob $3 million from Papi's bank in Tres Cruces, Texas to prosecute Papi for tax evasion. Stig reports to his commanding officer, Lieutenant Commander Harold Quince, who tells him to kill Bobby so they can use the money to fund covert operations. Bobby and Stig are surprised to find over $40 million in the vault, not $3 million. Stig follows orders to betray Bobby and escape with the money. He shoots Bobby in the upper arm rather than killing him, but is surprised to see Bobby's DEA badge and leaves him in the desert. After bringing in the money, Stig is betrayed by Quince, but escapes. Meanwhile a man named Earl aggressively interrogates people associated with the robbery and follows Bobby's trail.

Bobby goes to Stig's to find the money, only to have Stig contact him from a sniper post across the street. A hit squad sent by Quince attacks the apartment but Stig helps Bobby escape. Bobby tries to tell Jessup what happened, but Earl and his men are already there. Earl kills Jessup, frames Bobby, and lets him go, agreeing to clear his name if he recovers the $43 million. Bobby and Stig kidnap Papi and clear the air between them before interrogating Papi in Rees' garage. Papi tells them that Earl is a CIA Agent and that the money they stole was the CIA's cut of drug profits Papi and other cartels pay in exchange for using CIA planes to smuggle drugs across the border. When the house is attacked by Quince's team, Bobby, Stig, and Rees escape, as does Papi. The three are captured by Papi's men and taken to his farm. After a beating, the men are given 24 hours to return the money or Rees will die. Bobby infiltrates Quince's office at the Naval Air Station in Corpus Christi, discovering Quince is Rees' boyfriend, and they had planned to steal the money for themselves. 

Meanwhile, Stig asks Admiral Tuwey, Quince's boss, for help. Tuwey orders Quince's arrest but disavows Stig to protect the Navy's reputation. Both men escape from US Navy Masters-at-Arms officers, but Papi kills Rees because they were unable to return the money in time. Bobby later realizes the money is in a motel room he and Rees had frequented, while Stig returns to Papi's farm for vengeance. Stig is surrounded by Papi's men when both Quince and Earl intervene. Bobby arrives in a car filled with money and blows it up, scattering bills everywhere and leading to a massive shootout. During a standoff, Earl reveals that the CIA has 20 other secret banks, and the loss of the $43 million is only a minor setback. Signaling Stig with a phrase from an earlier conversation, Bobby shoots Quince and Stig shoots Earl. Finally, they kill Papi and escape, but not before Bobby shoots Stig in the leg as payback for being shot earlier. They plan to continue to take down the CIA's secret banks, and Bobby reveals that he stashed some of the stolen money away.

Cast

Production
The film is an adaption of the comic series of the same name by Steven Grant. However, it has been noted by the Observer that it can also be seen as evocative of the 1973 thriller Charley Varrick. The pictures have similar plots and in both cases the bank being robbed is in a town named Tres Cruces.

Filming took place in New Orleans, Louisiana, and areas throughout New Mexico. While filming in Louisiana, the production spent $57.5 million in the state and received a $17.6 million subsidy under the state's film incentive program. 2 Guns marked the second collaboration for Wahlberg and Kormákur. They had first worked together on the film Contraband (2012). It also marks the second collaboration between Washington and Patton, who had starred together in Déjà Vu (2006).

Reception

Critical response
The site's consensus reads, "Formulaic and often jarringly violent, 2 Guns rests its old-school appeal on the interplay between its charismatic, well-matched stars." Metacritic gave a score of 55 out of 100 based on 43 critics, indicating "mixed or average reviews".

Ben Kenigsberg of The A.V. Club gave the film a C+ rating and wrote, "For some, the no-frills action, half-pint Jim Thompson scenario, and buddy-cop wisecracks might be enough." Peter Bradshaw of The Guardian gave the film 2 out of 5 stars. R. Kurt Osenlund of Slant Magazine gave the film 2 out of 4 stars. "It's noticeably odd that 2 Guns has the desire to make offhanded sociopolitical statements, but not the will to take them anywhere truly provocative," he wrote. Peter Travers of Rolling Stone also gave the film 2 out of 4 stars, commenting that the film did not make the extra effort. Lisa Kennedy of The Denver Post gave the film 3 out of 4 stars and wrote that "the biggest guns this action flick brandishes are stars Denzel Washington and Mark Wahlberg who have very different acting styles that work surprisingly well together."

Box office
2 Guns debuted at the top of the box office with $27.1 million in its first weekend.  It eventually grossed $75.6 million in North America and $56.3 million elsewhere, for a $131.9 million worldwide gross against a budget of $61 million.

References

External links
 
 
 

2013 films
2010s English-language films
2013 action thriller films
2010s buddy comedy films
2010s buddy cop films
2010s chase films
American action thriller films
American buddy action films
American buddy cop films
American chase films
Boom! Studios adaptations
Films about the Drug Enforcement Administration
Films about bank robbery
Films about the Central Intelligence Agency
Films about Mexican drug cartels
Films about the United States Navy
Films based on American comics
Films directed by Baltasar Kormákur
Films produced by Marc E. Platt
Films scored by Clinton Shorter
Films set in Mexico
Films set in Texas
Films shot in New Mexico
Films shot in New Orleans
Live-action films based on comics
MoviePass Films films
TriStar Pictures films
Stage 6 Films films
Universal Pictures films
2010s American films